Grenville Thomas Owen Wilson, registered at birth as Thomas Grenville Owen Wilson, (born 9 April 1932) is an English former first-class cricketer who played 13 matches for Worcestershire in the early 1950s.

Wilson made his debut at Northampton in August 1951, though he did not enjoy a particularly successful game, taking only one wicket (that of Frederick Jakeman) in the first innings for the cost of 56 runs and finishing with 0–20 off six overs in the second. With the bat he made 0 and 0 not out, an early pointer as to his ability — or lack thereof — in that department. He was not picked again that season.

1952 saw Wilson's only real run in the Worcestershire side, as he played 11 County Championship games and picking up 16 wickets, albeit at an unimpressive average of 53.18. His best performance, and indeed the best of his career, came in his first appearance of the year, against Middlesex, when he took five wickets: 2–84 in the first innings and 3–42 in the second. Unfortunately for him, he could only manage 11 more in the nine further matches he played that summer.

He was to play only once more at first-class level, when he was part of the team that faced Somerset in June 1953. Worcestershire won the game by three wickets thanks largely to the efforts of Reg Perks (10–135 in the match) and George Dews (100 in the first innings), but Wilson himself was a bit-part player: he bowled 17 overs, but took only the single wicket of David Evans.

Wilson's batting was abysmal: in 16 first-class innings he made a grand total of ten runs: he scored 4 once, 2 twice, 1 twice and 0 eleven times. His career batting average failed to dip below one only because seven of his innings were not out. In 1952 he produced a sequence of six visits to the crease without scoring: 0*, 0, 0, 0*, 0* and 0.

External links
 

1932 births
Living people
English cricketers
Worcestershire cricketers